James Shaver may refer to:

 James L. Shaver (1902–1985), lieutenant governor of Arkansas, 1943–1947
 James L. Shaver Jr. (born 1927), member of the Arkansas House of Representatives, 1961–1994
 James W. Shaver, steam boat captain and founder of the Shaver Transportation Company